Oliver Wright may refer to:

 Oliver Wright (boxer) (1947–2018)
 Oliver Wright (diplomat) (1922–2009)
 Oliver Wright (trade unionist) (1881–1938)